Hail to the Rangers is a 1943 American Western film directed by William Berke and written by Gerald Geraghty. The film stars Charles Starrett, Arthur Hunnicutt, Robert Owen Atcher, Leota Atcher, Norman Willis and Lloyd Bridges. The film was released on September 15, 1943, by Columbia Pictures.

Plot

Cast          
Charles Starrett as Steve McKay
Arthur Hunnicutt as Arkansas 
Robert Owen Atcher as Bob Atcher
Leota Atcher as Bonnie Montgomery
Norman Willis as Monte Kerlin
Lloyd Bridges as Dave Kerlin
Ted Adams as Sam Schuyler
Ernie Adams as Latham
Tom London as Jessup
Davison Clark as Maj. Montgomery
Jack Kirk as Sheriff Ward
Dick Botiller as Tobin

References

External links
 

1943 films
1940s English-language films
American Western (genre) films
1943 Western (genre) films
Columbia Pictures films
Films directed by William A. Berke
American black-and-white films
1940s American films